Piled Gems, or Rinpo Chepungwa, is one of the Seventeen tantras of Dzogchen Upadesha.

Citations

Primary resources
Rin chen spungs pa’i yon tan chen po ston pa rgyud kyi rgyal po @ Wikisource in Wylie
རིན་ཆེན་སྤུངས་པ་ཡོན་ཏན་ཆེན་པོ་སྟོན་པ་རྒྱུད་ཀྱི་རྒྱལ་པོ @ Wikisource in Uchen (Tibetan Script), Unicode

Dzogchen texts
Nyingma tantras